Ionuț Radu Mitran (born 9 March 2002) is a Romanian professional footballer who plays as a defender for CSM Slatina, on loan from CS Universitatea Craiova.

Honours

Universitatea Craiova
Cupa României: 2020–21
Supercupa României: 2021

References

External links
 

2002 births
Living people
People from Olt County
Romanian footballers
Association football defenders
Liga I players
Liga II players
CS Universitatea Craiova players
CSM Slatina footballers